Magnetic shoe closures are devices that close shoes using two magnetic bits attached to the shoelaces. The closures can be applied to most shoes.

Description 
Magnetic shoe closure devices close shoes using two magnetic bits attached to the shoelaces, and where the bits take the place of the knot and bow. The closures can be applied to most shoes as they are not directly linked to them, but the consumer ties them to the shoelaces.

Reception 
A 2016 review in The Denver Post indicated the solution held tight for various activities, though it is perhaps "difficult to maneuver for some physically challenged individuals."

References 

Footwear accessories
Textile closures